Rohanixalus is a genus of tree frogs in the family Rhacophoridae native to the Andaman islands and Indo-Burma region. The genus was established in 2020 by Indian herpetologist S.D. Biju of the University of Delhi and his colleagues. The genus comprises eight species.

Etymology
The genus was named after Sri Lankan taxonomist Rohan Pethiyagoda, who is a prominent Ichthyologist responsible for the discovery and/or description of almost 100 new species of vertebrates from Sri Lanka, including fishes, amphibians and lizards, in addition to 43 species of freshwater crabs.

Description
There is a pair of contrastingly colored lateral lines on either side of the body. Some minute brown speckles can be found scattered throughout the upper body surfaces. Females known to lay light greenish eggs in arboreal bubble-nests. Female mothers show maternal egg attendance where the mother attends the egg clutches until hatching and later assists in release of the tadpoles into the water.

Distribution
The species are distributed throughout northeast, the Andaman islands, Myanmar, Thailand, Malaysia, Indonesia, Vietnam, Laos, and Cambodia, up to southern China.

Species

References

Rohanixalus
Rhacophoridae
Amphibians of Asia
Amphibian genera
Taxa named by Sathyabhama Das Biju